The Philippine House Special Committee on Strategic Intelligence is a special committee of the Philippine House of Representatives.

Jurisdiction 
As prescribed by House Rules, the committee's jurisdiction is on strategic intelligence initiatives, activities, and programs of the Philippine government which includes, but not limited to the following:
 Counter-intelligence
 Counter-terrorism
 Economic intelligence
 Foreign intelligence

Members, 18th Congress

Historical members

18th Congress

Chairperson 
 Fredenil Castro (Capiz–2nd, Lakas) March 10, 2020 – December 7, 2020

See also 
 House of Representatives of the Philippines
 List of Philippine House of Representatives committees
 National Intelligence Coordinating Agency

References

External links 
House of Representatives of the Philippines

Strategic Intelligence